Cyperus tenuiflorus is a sedge of the family Cyperaceae, commonly known as scaly sedge.

It blooms between spring and late summer, October and April in the southern hemisphere, producing green-brown flowers.

It has been introduced into Western Australia it is found in coastal areas around damp areas in the Wheatbelt, Peel and South West regions where it grows in sandy or clay soils.

See also
List of Cyperus species

References

Plants described in 1773
Flora of Western Australia
tenuiflorus
Taxa named by Christen Friis Rottbøll